The Minister of Health and Child Care in Zimbabwe is retired general Constantino Guveya Dominic Chiwenga. He was appointed by the president of Zimbabwe on 5 August 2020, making him the 8th minister of Health of Zimbabwe since its liberation in 1980.

Chiwenga succeeded Dr Obadiah Moyo who left office due to corruption charges of illegally awarding a multi-million-dollar contract for medical equipment.

References 

Government ministers of Zimbabwe